Sock-a-Bye Baby is a 1942 short subject directed by Jules White starring American slapstick comedy team The Three Stooges (Moe Howard, Larry Fine and Curly Howard). It is the 66th entry in the series released by Columbia Pictures starring the comedians, who released 190 shorts for the studio between 1934 and 1959.

Plot 
The Stooges awake in the middle of the night to a crying baby left on their doorstep. A letter from the despondent mother (Julie Gibson) states that baby Jimmy (Joyce Gardner) has been abandoned. The Stooges react by taking the little guy in, feeding him, and trying their best to act fatherly.

Later, Larry finds a newspaper article stating a child kidnapping, and the Stooges believe that Jimmy is the child and the kidnappers left a phony note. When the mother and two motorcycle cops come to reclaim the baby, the Stooges evacuate their home quickly, with Jimmie in tow; unbeknownst to the Stooges Jimmy crawled into the back seat of their car. The police on their motorcycles track them down and the baby is returned to the parents who, the father being one of the cops, reconcile. The Stooges, meanwhile, make a conspicuous escape by skittering away hidden in large haystacks.

Production notes 
Filming for Sock-a-Bye Baby commenced between April 28 and May 1, 1942. The film title is a parody of the lullaby "Rock-a-bye Baby", likely shared by the similarly-named Popeye cartoon Sock-a-Bye, Baby from 1934, 8 years earlier, made by Fleischer Studios.

This short is one of the rare few that contains explicit racial humor. Specifically, after Curly begins singing a song about Japanese people, he catches himself and says "What am I sayin'? Poo on the Japanese." The U.S. was at war with Japan during World War II at the time and jingoism was a presence in the media.

Footage was reused in the 1960 compilation feature film Stop! Look! and Laugh!

While washing the celery being prepared for Jimmy's meal, Curly sings an a cappella nonsense song with lyrics imagining he was a Brazilian coffee bean: "I was a boy in Brazil and I grew on a tree. / When they shook the tree then I fell down. / Then they put me in a bag / and they fastened on a tag / and they shipped me off to New York town."

References

External links 
 
 
Sock-a-Bye Baby at threestooges.net

1942 films
1942 comedy films
The Three Stooges films
American black-and-white films
Films directed by Jules White
Columbia Pictures short films
American slapstick comedy films
Films about babies
1940s English-language films
1940s American films